The Color of Me is a 2018 American family drama fantasy film that is written and directed by Sreejith Nair. It is about an adopted African American boy, Lewis Clark, who falls in love with a girl whose skin magically changes color every hour. The film received critical acclaim and several accolades at its international festival run across the United States. It premiered at the Los Angeles CineFest with subsequent screenings at various film festivals. The film was chosen as an official selection at the Amazon Prime Studios first All Voice Film Festival 2019.

Plot
An adopted African American Lewis Clark, falls in love with a young woman, Lisa Adams, who is the victim of a magical curse. The curse causes Lisa to transform into 5 different races: Caucasian, Indian, Chinese, Hispanic, and African-American.

Cast
 Terrell Pierce - Lewis Clark
 Norma Chacon - Lisa Adams (Hispanic)
 Jennifer Lenius - Lisa Adams (Caucasian)
 Pearl Paramadilok - Lisa Adams (Asian)
 Eva Shah - Lisa Adams (Indian)
 Tayler Turner - Lisa Adams (African American)

Background
As an Indian American, the director Sreejith Nair said:

Critical reception and reviews
"This unexpected, quirky tale explores what it means to love the skin you're in. It challenges us to explore how we alter our behavior based on the world's perceptions of us and what it would take for us to stop" as reviewed by Chimera Ensemble. Pallavi Kanmadikar of Dish Dash described the film as "a revelation, that will force you to rethink your own opinions about people" further adding "because no individual can be defined by what they look like".

Roopa Modha of Urban Asian noted, "In the era of social media boom, the issue of self-acceptance is a big one and The Color of Me speaks volumes about how we see ourselves and what we are lead to believe are the acceptable norms of the society. The movie brings to light the issues of discrimination and privilege".
Jharna Malaviya in her review for The Dish Dash said, "The Color of Me approaches the question of race in a way that has never been seen before".

Awards and nominations

Official selections and screenings

References

External links
 

2018 films
2018 short films
2018 drama films
2018 fantasy films
African-American drama films
American independent films
American drama short films
Films about Indian Americans
2010s English-language films
2010s American films